The Hungarian Rugby Union is the governing body for rugby union in Hungary. It was founded in 1990 and became affiliated to the International Rugby Board in 1992. It organises the three leagues, the Extraliga, the NB I and II, for what concerns rugby union. A few rugby 7s tournaments with also National 7s league and University Rugby 7s, and the various national teams. It is based in Esztergom.

History
The union was founded in 1990 by László Hardy (president), Sándor Erdélyi (secretary-general) and Béla Körmöczi (board member) with nine clubs. It has since expanded to include 9 other clubs. In 2019, Hungarian rugby celebrated its 50th anniversary.

Hungarian Rugby teams

Extraliga 
 Battai Bátor Bulldogok
 Elefántok Rögbi SE
 Esztergomi Vitézek Suzuki
 Fit World Rugby Club
 Kecskeméti Atlétika és Rugby Club

NB I 
 Benny Bulls Rugby Club
 Fehérvári Rögbi Klub
 Pécsi Indiánok
 Szentesi VSC 91-esek Rögbi Szakosztálya[1]
 Budapesti Exiles RE
 Medvék Rögbi Club
 DEAC Debrecen Rugby Football Club

NB II 
 Dunaújvárosi Szomjas Tevék
 Gyöngyösi Farkasok
 Velencei Kék Cápák
 Általános Vállalkozási Főiskola Vak Mókusok
 Gödöllői Ördögök Rögbi Klub
 Restart-CVSE Kék Nefelejcs Rögbi Klub, Cegléd

Women teams 
 Budapest Magpies
 Dunaújvárosi Szomjas Tevék
 Fehérvári Rögbi Klub

Barbarian team 
 Kalandozó Magyarok (Hungarian adventurers)

Other teams 
 Vörösmarty SC
 MTK Rögbiklub
 Árpádföldi Rögbiklub
 Újpesti Spartacus
 Botond SC
 OKGT
 Elte-Beac
 Liget SE
 Zöld Sólymok
 Maccabi
 Mecsek Lakóterületi SE
 Győri MGTSZ Rögbi Klub
 Pécsi Termeszek
 Érdi Ártatlanok
 Érdi Darazsak
 Érdi VSE Rögbiszakosztály
 MGM Diósd
 Békásmegyeri LSE Rugby
 Pákozdi Rögbi Klub
 SUB ROSA Rugby
 Miskolci Keselyűk
 Tárnok RC
 Köfém RC
 Fekete Hollók
 Szegedi Mogorva Gorillák
 Mogyoród RC
 Testnevelési Főiskola
 Rendőrtiszti Főiskola
 Leányfalui Old Boy
 Inter RC
 Győri Újkalász MTSZ
 Labor MIM
 III. ker. TTVE
 Szakipari Építők
 Keszthelyi Kék Villámok
 Gyáli Red Bulls Rögbi Klub
 Apostagi Rögbi Klub
 Szentlőrinci Rögbi Klub
 Kőszegi Rögbi Klub

See also
 List of rugby clubs in Hungary
 Hungary national rugby union team
 Rugby union in Hungary

References

External links
  Magyar Rögbi Szövetség - Official Site

Rugby union in Hungary
Rugby
H
Sports organizations established in 1990
1990 establishments in Hungary